Vladislav Vladimirovich Vetrov (born 9 February 1964) is a Soviet and Russian theater and film actor, director and writer.

Biography
Vladislav Vetrov was born in Senaki, Georgian SSR, Soviet Union (now Georgia), moved to Taganrog, Rostov Oblast.

In 1986 he graduated from the Taganrog Institute of Radio Engineering. On stage since 1985. He worked at the Riga Russian Theatre,  School of Dramatic Art  by Anatoly Vasiliev in Moscow, Laboratory of Mikhail Butkevych. From 1989 to 1991 he worked in the Maxim Gorky Rostov Drama Theater. Then he worked for a short time in the  School of Dramatic Art.

Filmography

Films

TV Series

References

External links

1964 births
Living people
Soviet male film actors
Russian male film actors
Russian male television actors
Russian male stage actors
Russian male voice actors
20th-century Russian male actors
21st-century Russian male actors
Russian film directors
Russian screenwriters
Honored Artists of the Russian Federation